Nugroho Wisnumurti (born 23 March 1940) is an Indonesian retired diplomat. He was Indonesia's permanent representative to the United Nations in Geneva from 2000 to 2004.

Education
 National Resilience Institute (Lemhannas), Jakarta (1988)
 Columbia Law School, New York City (1973)
 University of Indonesia Faculty of Law (1965)

Curriculum vitae
 Ambassador/Permanent Representative of the Republic of Indonesia to the United Nations (in New York City) (1992–97)
 Ambassador to Jamaica, the Bahamas, Guatemala and Nicaragua (1992–1997)
 Representative of Indonesia to the United Nations Security Council (1995–1996)
 President, United Nations Security Council (August 1995 and November 1996)
 Chairman, Coordinating Bureau of the Non-Aligned Movement (1992–1995)
 Member, UN Group of Experts on Defensive Security (1991–92)
 Member, Group of Experts of the Non-Aligned Movement South Centre on UN's Role in Promoting International Cooperation (1991–1992)
 Negotiator/Chief Negotiator for various agreements on maritime delimitation with neighboring countries (1977–1989)
 Deputy Head, Indonesia's Delegation to the Conference on Disarmament, Geneva (1982–1986)
 Member and Secretary, Indonesia's Delegation to the Third UN Conference on the Law of the Sea (1974–1982)
 Member, Indonesia's Delegation to the UN Seabed Committee (1971–1974)

Family
Mr. Wisnumurti is married to Nan Irama Wisnumurti. They have one daughter.

He is a first cousin, once removed, of Prof. Mr. Soenario, S.H. (1902–1997), Indonesia's minister of foreign affairs from 1953 to 1955.

Notes

1940 births
People from Surakarta
Living people
University of Indonesia alumni
Columbia Law School alumni
Columbia Law School
Indonesian diplomats
Permanent Representatives of Indonesia to the United Nations
Ambassadors of Indonesia to Nicaragua
Ambassadors of Indonesia to Guatemala
Ambassadors of Indonesia to the Bahamas
Ambassadors of Indonesia to Jamaica
Indonesian expatriates in Switzerland
Indonesian expatriates in the United States
Members of the International Law Commission